Smith Estate may refer to:

 Smith Estate (Los Angeles), California
 Smith Estate (Ridge, New York), listed on the National Register of Historic Places in New York